The 1995 Mercedes Cup was a men's tennis tournament played on outdoor clay courts and held at the Tennis Club Weissenhof in Stuttgart, Germany that was part of the 1995 ATP Tour. It was the 18th edition of the tournament and was held from 17 July until 24 July 1995. First-seeded Thomas Muster won the singles title.

Finals

Singles
 Thomas Muster defeated  Jan Apell, 6–2, 6–2
 It was Muster's 8th singles title of the year and the 31st of his career.

Doubles
 Tomás Carbonell /  Francisco Roig defeated  Ellis Ferreira /  Jan Siemerink, 6–1, 6–7, 7–5

References

External links
 Official website 
 ITF tournament edition details
 ATP tournament profile

Stuttgart Open
Stuttgart Open
1995 in German tennis